Hannah Gadsby: Douglas is a live comedy performance written and performed by Australian comedian Hannah Gadsby, which debuted in 2019. The show follows on the success of her previous show Nanette, which helped Gadsby expand her international audience. The show toured internationally, and a video of her Los Angeles performance of this show was released as a Netflix comedy special in May 2020.

Performances
Gadsby performed Douglas globally, opening at the Arts Centre Melbourne in Melbourne, Australia. In her first US tour, she performed across the United States in over 10 states as well as a five-week stint at the Daryl Roth Theater in New York City. Her tour also had performances in the United Kingdom and across Europe.

The show toured internationally, for example in the US, Canada, Australia and the Netherlands.

On May 26, 2020, Netflix released a film of Gadsby performing the show at the Ace Hotel Theatre, in Los Angeles. Gadsby cut a portion of her live show from the Netflix show which discussed a slur that a former girlfriend insulted her with.

Content
The show begins with Gadsby outlining the chronology of the show in a move she says to manage expectations. It begins with mundane observational humor, including mocking American culture. The main thrust of the show continues on topics first highlighted in her previous show Nanette such as her experiences with misogyny and as a lesbian woman and her autism diagnosis often through the lens of historical art.

"Douglas" is the name of Gadsby's dog. She explains to a stranger at a dog park that the pouch of Douglas is the space between the rectum and vagina of a woman. She expresses surprise that a male physician (James Douglas) made this discovery. She jokes that men have hormones, and "sometimes you get testy". (A pun on "testy" meaning "irritable" and the hormone testosterone produced by the testes.) Gadsby is amused by the naming of the Teenage Mutant Ninja Turtles, who are all named after one of the Italian Renaissance artists, Leonardo (da Vinci), Raphael and Michelangelo, and the fourth one is named after Donatello, while it would have made more sense to chose Titian. She says that the artist name Titian belongs to that street gang, but the "target demographic of that television show could not handle a name that begins with 'tit' because of their fucking hormones."

Gadsby said that the Venus of Willendorf pre-dates ancient Greek beauty ideals.

Reception
The website's critics consensus reads: "Humorously human and poignantly hilarious, Douglas is an expertly constructed hour of comedy that further affirms Hannah Gadsby's mastery of her craft." On Metacritic it has a score of 75% based on reviews from 8 critics, indicating "generally favorable reviews".

Inkoo Kang of The Hollywood Reporter wrote: "If Nanette demonstrated Gadsby's mastery of tone and command of the audience, Douglas is an even richer showcase for the comic's technical prowess." Entertainment Weeklys Leah Greenblatt called it "a natural extension of Nanette and a gentle buffering of it." Brian Logan of The Guardian in commented that "it’s a well-constructed set, with a high hit-rate of jokes". New York Times''' Jason Zinoman in his review of the film called it a "surprisingly slick, joke-dense show" and ambitious like her previous special, while also saying that the show's "cleverness gets in its own way". Brian Lowry of CNN contrasted it with her previous work Nanette'' saying "While there are some very funny bits, clever observations and yes, personal information strewn along the way, perhaps inevitably nothing lands with quite the raw intensity of her debut."

Accolades

References

External links
 

2020 films
Australian comedy television films
2020s feminist films
Lesbian culture in Australia
Lesbian feminist mass media
Stand-up comedy concert films
Australian LGBT-related films
2020 LGBT-related films
2020 comedy films
Netflix specials
LGBT-related comedy films
Autism in the arts
Films about autism
2020s English-language films
2020s Australian films